Strawberry Mansion High School is a public high school in the Strawberry Mansion section of Philadelphia. It is part of the School District of Philadelphia. It was previously named Strawberry Mansion Junior / Senior High School, and Strawberry Mansion Middle/High School.

History
Strawberry Mansion opened in 1977. In April 1992 the school had 1,600 students both middle and high school grades and 65% of them were from low income families. At that time the school had a high drop out rate. That year the school had a Business Academy, a "school within a school" teaching students job skills and preparing them for further education and immediate post-graduation employment.

In June 2011 Thomas FitzSimons High School and The Young Women's Leadership School at Rhodes High School closed, and the students were reassigned to Strawberry Mansion.

In May 2013 the school had 435 students. At that time 92 students were in the graduating class and 55 of them were accepted to community colleges and/or four year universities. Some of them were unable to afford the deposit fees. As of 2013 every student is required to go through a metal detector and the school had 94 security cameras. From 2008 to 2013, it was consistently on the Commonwealth of Pennsylvania's list of "persistently dangerous high schools".

Academics
In 1992, Kimberly McLarin of the Philadelphia Inquirer wrote that Strawberry Mansion was "not known for academic excellence". She would later write that the school's science club, named Science Force 2000, was "becoming a force at city and regional science fairs."

In 1992, a 16-year-old student submitted a science fair project that concluded that lead levels in water in residences of teachers living in Mount Airy and North Philadelphia, among other areas, were high, but at levels acceptable under federal law. Due to the project, some teachers residing in those areas began having their own water pipes tested.

Football

In August 2015, the Strawberry Mansion varsity football team began to practice, after a hiatus of almost 50 years. In their first season back, they were undefeated.

Controversy
Strawberry Mansion High School is considered to be one of the most dangerous public high schools in the country. The Pennsylvania commission on crime and delinquency consistently labeled it as one of the state's most dangerous schools until its removal from the list in 2013.

Feeder patterns
Schools feeding into Strawberry Mansion include:

Notable alumni
 Dwayne Davis - Basketball player
 Tevin Farmer - Boxer
 Meek Mill - Rapper
 D. J. Newbill - Basketball player
 Jazmine Sullivan - Singer
 Ronald "Flip" Murray - Former NBA Player

References

Further reading
 Campbell, Terri. "Teacher's Perspective: Getting Students in Struggling, Violent Philadelphia School 'To Believe in Themselves'." ABC News. May 30, 2013.
 Sawyer, Diane. "Fear and Hope at Strawberry Mansion A Hidden America with Diane Sawyer'." ABC News. May 30, 2013.
 Sawyer, Diane. "Strawberry Mansion Receives Help, including visit from Drake A Hidden America (Nightline)'." ABC News. Dec 04, 2013.

External links

 
 Former attendance boundary (Archive) - Prior to the closure of FitzSimons and Rhoads)

School District of Philadelphia
High schools in Philadelphia
Strawberry Mansion, Philadelphia